Fuertesia is a genus of flowering plants in the family Loasaceae. It has only one currently accepted species, Fuertesia domingensis, native to Hispaniola. It is a woody climbing liana.

References

Loasaceae
Cornales genera
Flora of Hispaniola
Monotypic asterid genera
Plants described in 1911